Gonda Aline Hector Van Steen (born 8 April 1964 in Aalst, Belgium) is a Belgian-American classical scholar and linguist, who specialises in ancient and modern Greek language and literature. Since 2018, she has been Koraes Professor of Modern Greek and Byzantine History, Language and Literature, the first woman to hold this position, and Director of the Centre for Hellenic Studies at King's College London. She previously held the Cassas Chair in Greek Studies at the University of Florida, and taught at  the University of Arizona and at Cornell University. She has also served as the President of the Modern Greek Studies Association (2012–2014).

Selected works
  Translated into Greek as Ζητούνται παιδιά από την Ελλάδα: Υιοθεσίες στην Αμερική του Ψυχρού Πολέμου, Potamos editions, 2021. .

References

1964 births
Living people
Belgian classical scholars
American classical scholars
Linguists from Belgium
Scholars of Greek language
Academics of King's College London
University of Florida faculty
Cornell University faculty
University of Arizona faculty
Women classical scholars
American people of Belgian descent
Women literary historians